Coleophora fulvociliella is a moth of the family Coleophoridae. It is found in Algeria and Libya.

References

fulvociliella
Moths described in 1915
Moths of Africa